Statistics of Czechoslovak First League in the 1973–74 season.

Overview
It was contested by 16 teams, and ŠK Slovan Bratislava won the championship. Ladislav Józsa and Přemysl Bičovský were the league's top scorers with 17 goals each.

Stadia and locations

League standings

Results

Top goalscorers

References

External links
Czechoslovakia - List of final tables (RSSSF)

Czechoslovak First League seasons
Czech
1973–74 in Czechoslovak football